The Good Humor Party, is a satirical organization, founded in Poland on 28 June 2001 by Polish cartoonist and journalist Szczepan Sadurski, during the Good Humor Festival in Gdańsk. It claims to have some 3,000 members all around the world, many of them satirists.

Goals and membership
The goal of the Good Humor Party is to make people happy. The membership fee is stated as "three wide smiles a day". The party cooperates with people and organizations with similar goals, supports entertainment initiatives and finds humor in current affairs.

A party symbol is Happy Skyscraper (Polish: Wesoły Wieżowiec), a model of a tall building bearing the party's logo. Those who wish to join the party are asked to download, construct and then photograph a model skyscraper alongside a well-known landmark in their town or city and then email it to the Good Humor Party. The first Happy Skyscraper was placed in Manhattan on 10 October 2012. Since then, model skyscrapers have been photographed in a variety of well-known locations, including Sydney, New Delhi, Santiago, Lima and Yerevan.

Government and political stance
Good Humor Party claims to have its own informal government and ambassadors, including in the United States. It is active on social media and has an e-magazine. Although the party describes itself as nonpolitical, in the 2012 United States presidential election, it supported the performance artist and presidential candidate Vermin Supreme.

References

External sources
 Partia Dobrego Humoru website
Images of funny skyscrapers at Newsy (text in Polish)

Cultural organisations based in Poland
Joke political parties in Poland